Mating types are the microorganism equivalent to sexes in multicellular lifeforms and are thought to be the ancestor to distinct sexes. They also occur in macro-organisms such as fungi.

Definition
Mating types are the microorganism equivalent to sex in higher organisms and occur in isogamous and anisogamous species. Depending on the group, different mating types are often referred to by numbers, letters, or simply "+" and "−" instead of "male" and "female", which refer to "sexes" or differences in size between gametes. Syngamy can only take place between gametes carrying different mating types.

Occurrence
Reproduction by mating types is especially prevalent in fungi. Filamentous ascomycetes usually have two mating types referred to as "MAT1-1" and "MAT1-2", following the yeast mating-type locus (MAT). Under standard nomenclature, MAT1-1 (which may informally be called MAT1) encodes for a regulatory protein with an alpha box motif, while MAT1-2 (informally called MAT2) encodes for a protein with a high motility-group (HMG) DNA-binding motif, as in the yeast mating type MATα1. The corresponding mating types in yeast, a non-filamentous ascomycete, are referred to as MATa and MATα.

Mating type genes in ascomycetes are called idiomorphs rather than alleles due to the uncertainty of the origin by common descent. The proteins they encode are transcription factors which regulate both the early and late stages of the sexual cycle. Heterothallic ascomycetes produce gametes, which present a single Mat idiomorph, and syngamy will only be possible between gametes carrying complementary mating types. On the other hand, homothallic ascomycetes produce gametes that can fuse with every other gamete in the population (including its own mitotic descendants) most often because each haploid contains the two alternate forms of the Mat locus in its genome. 

Basidiomycetes can have thousands of different mating types.

In the ascomycete Neurospora crassa matings are restricted to interaction of strains of opposite mating type. This promotes some degree of outcrossing.  Outcrossing, through complementation, could provide the benefit of masking recessive deleterious mutations in genes which function in the dikaryon and/or diploid stage of the life cycle.

Evolution 

In 1994 Malte Andersson suggested that mating types most likely predated the development of anisogamy.  Until 2006, there was no genetic evidence for the evolutionary link between sexes and mating types.

Secondary mating types evolved alongside simultaneous hermaphrodites in several lineages.

In ciliates multiple mating types evolved from binary mating types in several lineages. As of 2019, genomic conflict has been considered the leading explanation for the evolution of two mating types.

See also
 Mating in fungi
 Mating of yeast
 Mating-type locus
Saccharomyces cerevisiae (a and α mating types)
Schizophyllum commune (23,328 mating types)
Tetrahymena (7 mating types)

References

Mycology
Microbiology